Bryan Gasperoni (born 26 September 1974) is a Sammarinese footballer. He played as a midfielder for the San Marino national football team with 29 international caps.

References

Living people
Sammarinese footballers
San Marino international footballers
Competitors at the 1997 Mediterranean Games
1974 births
Place of birth missing (living people)

Association football midfielders
Mediterranean Games competitors for San Marino